Anthony Carbone (born 13 October 1974 in Australia) is an Australian retired soccer player.

Career
In 1993, Carbone scored the first ever golden goal in football history against Uruguay at that year's FIFA World Youth Championship, helping him earn a move to Nottingham Forest in the English Premier League.

In 2001, he played professionally for Hougang United in the Singaporean S.League.

References

External links
 Anthony Carbone at OzFootball 

Australian soccer players
Australian expatriate sportspeople in England
Australian people of Italian descent
Living people
Association football midfielders
1974 births
Perth Glory FC players